The 2015–16 Penn State Lady Lions basketball team will represent Pennsylvania State University during the 2015–16 NCAA Division I women's basketball season. The Lady Lions, led by ninth year head coach Coquese Washington, play their home games at the Bryce Jordan Center and were members of the Big Ten Conference. They finished the season 12–19, 6–12 in Big Ten play to finish in eleventh place. They advanced to the second round of the Big Ten women's tournament where they lost to Purdue.

Roster

Schedule

|-
!colspan=9 style="background:#1C3C6B; color:white;"| Exhibition

|-
!colspan=9 style="background:#1C3C6B; color:white;"| Non-conference regular season

|-
!colspan=9 style="background:#1C3C6B; color:white;"| Big Ten regular season

|-
!colspan=9 style="background:#1C3C6B; color:white;"| Big Ten Women's Tournament

Source

Rankings

See also
2015–16 Penn State Nittany Lions basketball team

References

Penn State Lady Lions basketball seasons
Penn State